The Premier's Multicultural Communications Awards (PMCAs) are Australian journalism awards held each year by New South Wales Parliament and Multicultural NSW.

History
The awards, originally known as Premier's Multicultural Media Awards, were established in 2012 to recognise excellence and professionalism in the multicultural media and marketing industry.

The awards were renamed Premier's Multicultural Communications Awards, or PMCAs, in 2018 to celebrate contributions that journalists, photographers, editors, publishers and marketers made to the multicultural communities in New South Wales.

Description
The PMCAs are inclusive awards that have been establish to honour the work of individuals and media organisations that promote the advancement of multiculturalism in NSW and contributes to the enrichment of all sections of society through the benefits of cultural diversity. The gala events were normally held in the Sydney CBD and hosted by NSW Premier and Minister for Multiculturalism.

Due to the COVID-19 pandemic in Australia, the 2020 PMCAS were delivered fully online.

Winners

2019  
2019 winners are listed below.

2018 
2018 winners are listed below

2017 
2017 winners are listed below

2016

2015 
2015 winners are listed below.

2014 
2014 winners are listed below.

2013 
2013 winners are listed below.
Three hundred guests joined the then Premier and the Minister for Citizenship at the inaugural awards ceremony on 27 February 2013.

References

External links
 

Australian journalism awards